There are several places using the name Granite Hot Springs: 

 Granite Hot Springs, Nevada in Washoe County, Nevada, now known as Lawton Hot Springs
 Granite Hot Springs, Montana in Missoula County, Montana
 Granite Hot Springs, Wyoming in Sublette County, Wyoming